RS Basingstoke F.C. was a long running and successful amateur football club based in Basingstoke.

History
The club were founded in 1971 as a pub side, Soldiers Return, and originally played Sunday football before switching to Saturday where they joined the Basingstoke League. After successfully climbing up through the divisions the side became founder members of the Chiltonian League in 1984 where they remained for two seasons before joining the North Hants League, which they won in 1986–87 resulting in their application to join Hampshire League Division 2 being successful.

Upon election the team then became known as SR Basingstoke and promptly proceeded to win promotion as champions in their debut season and soon established themselves in Division 1. In 1990 the club became known as DCA Basingstoke and finished runners-up in 1990–91.

In 1992 the club successfully applied to move up to the Combined Counties League where they maintained a steady mid-table position but, unable to develop their basic Whiteditch Playing Fields home they dropped out of the league after four seasons to rejoin the Chiltonian League in 1996 - a year later the club was renamed again as RS Basingstoke.

When the Chiltonian League was absorbed by the extended Hellenic League in 2000, RS Basingstoke joined and were placed in Division 1 East where they finished runners-up in their first season, but again due to ground grading were unable to apply for promotion.

In 2003 RS Basingstoke returned to the Hampshire League where they were placed in Division 2. The side finished 3rd and like most of the leagues other clubs they moved into the extended Wessex League in 2004 where they were placed in Division 3. This was the seventh league that they had played in during their existence.

2004–05 was sadly to prove the last season for the club as, despite being in a comfortable mid-table position, a player exodus resulted in the side withdrawing from the competition in January 2005 and folding.

Honours
Hellenic League Division 1 East
Runners-up 2000/01
Hampshire League Division 1
Runners-up 1990/91
Hampshire League Division 2
Champions 1987/88
North Hants League Champions
Winners 1986/87
North Hants Senior Cup
Winners 1988/89
Basingstoke & District League
Champions
Basingstoke Senior Cup
Winners

Records

League

References
https://www.dailyecho.co.uk/news/5556248.rs-call-time-on-their-34-years-of-football/

Defunct football clubs in England
Association football clubs established in 1971
Association football clubs disestablished in 2005
1971 establishments in England
2005 disestablishments in England
Sport in Basingstoke
Defunct football clubs in Hampshire
Basingstoke and District Football League
Chiltonian League
North Hants League
Hampshire League
Combined Counties Football League
Hellenic Football League
Wessex Football League